Kascha may refer to:
 Košice, city in Eastern Slovakia also known as Kascha

See also
Kasha (disambiguation)